Effetia is a genus of fungi within the Sordariaceae family. This is a monotypic genus, containing the single species Effetia craspedoconidica, found on woodland soil in the Ivory Coast.

References

External links
Effetia at Index Fungorum

Sordariales
Monotypic Sordariomycetes genera